Viviparidae, sometimes known as the river snails or mystery snails, are a family of large operculate freshwater snails, aquatic gastropod mollusks.

This family is classified in the informal group Architaenioglossa according to the taxonomy of the Gastropoda by Bouchet & Rocroi, 2005.

Distribution
This family occurs nearly worldwide in temperate and tropical regions, with the exception that they are absent from South America.

There are two genera of Viviparidae in Africa: Bellamya and Neothauma.

The oldest known vivparid is Viviparus langtonensis from the Middle Jurassic of England. The oldest records from the Southern Hemisphere is from the Late Jurassic Talbragar fossil beds of Australia.

Taxonomy 
The family Viviparidae contains 3 subfamilies (according to the taxonomy of the Gastropoda by Bouchet & Rocroi, 2005):
 Viviparinae Gray, 1847 (1833) - synonyms: Paludinidae Fitzinger, 1833 (inv.); Kosoviinae Atanackovic, 1859 (n.a.)
 Bellamyinae Rohrbach, 1937 - synonym: Amuropaludinidae Starobogatov, Prozorova, Bogatov & Sayenko, 2004 (n.a.)
 Lioplacinae Gill, 1863 - synonym: Campelomatinae Thiele, 1929

Genera 
Genera within the family Viviparidae include:

subfamily Viviparinae Gray, 1847
 Galizgia Mikhaylovskiy, 1903
 † Kosovia Atanacković, 1959
 Rivularia Heude, 1890
 Trochopaludina Starobogatov, 1985
 Tulotoma Haldeman, 1840
 Viviparus Montfort, 1810 - type genus

subfamily Bellamyinae Rohrbach, 1937
 Amuropaludina Moskvicheva, 1979
 Angulyagra Rao, 1931
 Anulotaia Brandt, 1968
 Anularya Zhang & Chen, 2015
 † Apameaus Sivan, Heller & van Damme, 2006 This Pliocene-Pleistocene genus contains only one species Apameaus apameae Sivan, Heller & van Damme, 2006
 Bellamya Jousseame, 1886 - type genus of the subfamily
 Boganmargarya Thach, 2018
 Cipangopaludina Hannibal, 1912
 Eyriesia P. Fischer, 1885 
 Filopaludina Habe, 1964
 Heterogen Annandale, 1921 - with the only species Heterogen longispira (E. A. Smith, 1886)
 Idiopoma Pilsbry, 1901
 Larina Adams, 1851
 Margarya Nevill, 1877 
 Mekongia Crosse & Fischer, 1876
 Neclarina Iredale, 1943
 Notopala Cotton, 1935
 Sinotaia Haas, 1939
 Taia Annandale, 1918
 † Temnotaia Annandale, 1919 
 Tchangmargarya He, 2013
 Torotaia Haas, 1939
 Trochotaia Brandt, 1974

subfamily Lioplacinae Gill, 1863
 Campeloma Rafinesque, 1819
 Lioplax Troschel, 1856

subfamily ?
 † Albianopalin Hamilton-Bruce, Smith & Gowlett-Holmes, 2002 - from Albian, New South Wales
 Neothauma E. A. Smith, 1880
 Siamopaludina Brandt, 1968

Genera brought into synonymy
 Centrapala Cotton, 1935: synonym of Larina A. Adams, 1855
 Contectiana Bourguignat, 1880: synonym of Viviparus Montfort, 1810
 Eularina Iredale, 1943: synonym of Larina A. Adams, 1855
 subfamily  † Kosoviinae Atanacković, 1959: synonym of Viviparidae Gray, 1847
 Lecythoconcha Annandale, 1920: synonym of Cipangopaludina Hannibal, 1912
 Metohia Popović, 1964 : (junior homonym, no replacement name available in 2014)
 Notopalena Iredale, 1943: synonym of Notopala Cotton, 1935
 Paludina Férussac, 1812: synonym of Viviparus Montfort, 1810
 Siamopaludina Brandt, 1968 : synonym of Filopaludina (Siamopaludina) Brandt, 1968 represented as Filopaludina Habe, 1964
 Vivipara : synonym of Viviparus Montfort, 1810

Life cycle 
Life spans have been reported from 3 to 11 years in various species of Viviparidae.

References

Further reading
 Hirano T., Saito T. & Chiba S. (2015). "Phylogeny of freshwater viviparid snails in Japan". Journal of Molluscan Studies 81(4): 435–441. .
 Qian Z.-X., Fang Y.-F. & He J. (2014). "A conchological review of Bellamyinae (Gastropoda: Viviparidae) of China". Shell Discoveries 1(3): 3-12.

External links 
 Ju-Guang Wang, Dong Zhang, Ivan Jakovlić, Wei-Min Wang, Sequencing of the complete mitochondrial genomes of eight freshwater snail species exposes pervasive paraphyly within the Viviparidae family (Caenogastropoda); PLOS|One, July 25, 2017

 
Taxa named by John Edward Gray
Gastropod families